Tessaropa tenuipes is a species of beetle in the family Cerambycidae. It was described by Haldeman in 1846.

References

Methiini
Beetles described in 1846